SpaceX Crew-4 was the Crew Dragon's fourth NASA Commercial Crew operational flight, and its seventh overall crewed orbital flight. The mission launched on 27 April 2022 at 07:52 UTC before docking with the International Space Station (ISS) at 23:37 UTC. It followed shortly after the private Axiom 1 mission to the ISS earlier in the month utilizing SpaceX hardware. Three American (NASA) astronauts and one European (ESA) astronaut were on board the mission. 

Crew-4 was the maiden flight of the Crew Dragon spacecraft named Freedom, named such by the crew because it "celebrates a fundamental human right, and the industry and innovation that emanate from the unencumbered human spirit". The booster used on this mission was the B1067, which makes it the first Commercial Crew mission to use a booster on its fourth flight (it previously was used to launch SpaceX Crew-3 in 2021).

Crew 
NASA astronauts Kjell Lindgren and Robert Hines were announced on 12 February 2021 to the crew. Samantha Cristoforetti was named the commander of Expedition 68 on 28 May 2021. Jessica Watkins was named mission specialist on 16 November 2021. Cristoforetti was later removed as commander of Expedition 68 due to the shortening of the Crew-4 mission.

Mission 
The mission duration was 170 days. The European part of the mission was called Minerva, named after the Roman goddess of wisdom, and it was European astronaut Cristoforetti's second mission to the ISS.

See also 
 Dragon C206 Endeavour
 Dragon C207 Resilience
 Boeing Starliner

References 

SpaceX Dragon 2
Spacecraft launched in 2022
SpaceX payloads contracted by NASA
SpaceX human spaceflights
2022 in the United States
Fully civilian crewed orbital spaceflights
Spacecraft which reentered in 2022